Alexandre Chkheidze, also known under his Polish name of Aleksander Czcheidze (1878–1940), was a Polish-Georgian military officer. He served with the rank of Colonel in the armed forces of the Democratic Republic of Georgia during the short period of its independence following World War I. Following the Bolshevik occupation of his country, Chkheidze (along with thousands of other Georgian officers) migrated to Poland, where he received further training in the Higher War School.

He was then admitted to the Polish Army as a contract officer and served as the Commander of Infantry (de facto deputy commander) of the Polish 16th Infantry Division. He took part in the Polish Defensive War of 1939 and fought with distinction in a number of battles. Taken prisoner by the Germans, he was handed over to the USSR in accordance with the Ribbentrop-Molotov Pact and then executed by the NKVD some time in 1940 during the infamous Katyn massacre.

Notes and references

Military personnel from Georgia (country)
People of World War II from Georgia (country)
Polish generals
Polish Army officers
Katyn massacre victims
1878 births
1940 deaths
Polish people executed by the Soviet Union
Georgian emigrants to Poland
People from Georgia (country) executed by the Soviet Union
Polish military personnel killed in World War II